Tathagatha Buddha: The Life & Times of Gautama Buddha , also known as Gautama Buddha and as The Path Finder,  is a multilingual feature film on the life and times of the Buddha directed by Allani Sridhar and is based upon the story by Sadguru Sivananda Murty.  The film was released in 2008.

Plot 
Initially released in 2007 by Dharmapatha Creations, the film tells the story of Siddhartha Gautama, Prince of Kapilavastu, situated in India, who lived during 6th century B.C. He was born on Vaisakha Poornima. The history of his family, the Ikshvaku dynasty, is traceable to pre-Ramayana times. Renouncing the life and responsibility of a king, Siddhartha Gautama sought a solution to human misery. Ever in the midst of the great Indian religious and spiritual traditions, he noticed what was most needed by all people: Dharma, and non-violence. He sought a direct path to salvation. He was a lone pathfinder who inspired the religions that eventually spread to China, Japan, and to the United States and Europe as late as the 20th century.

Production
Filming took place primarily in Ramoji Film City, Annapurna, Manchirevula, Bodh Gaya, and Lumbini, and was in post-production by July 2007. The film's audio had its launch by Chief Minister Dr. Rajasekhar Reddy in November 2007, at which event he praised the film and director by saying that "the film and its message were the need of the hour as people were getting tired of all the violence around them"  The film was produced and released in three different languages; as Tadgatha Buddha in Hindi, as Gautama Buddha in Telugu, and as The Path Finder in English.

Cast 
 Sunil Sharma as Buddha
 Kausha Rach as Yashodhara
  Suman as Bimbisara
 Puneet Issar as Anguli Mala
 Parvati Melton
 Surender Pal as Suddhodhana
 Appaji Ambarisha Darbha as Rishi

Soundtrack
This film all music composed by Shashi Preetam & all Lyrics by Dr. D. K. Goyal in Hindi.

Reception
Tathagatha Buddha was a hit at Box Office. The Hindu wrote that the director  breaks new ground in revealing the fascinating story of Prince Siddhartha and his spiritual transformation into the Buddha, the great teacher who changed the entire world.

See also 
 Depictions of Gautama Buddha in film
List of historical drama films of Asia
 Tathagatha Buddha

Awards
 The film producer K. Rajasekhar won for Nandi Special Jury Award.

References

External links
 Buddha Photo gallery on Idlebrain
 

2008 films
Films about Gautama Buddha
Indian multilingual films
Films about Buddhism